Fall River Navigation Company was shipping company founded in Fall River, Massachusetts in 1927, as a subsidiary of the William C. Atwater & Company. Willaim C. Atwater & Company was a coal and fuel oil merchant founded on April 15, 1898 by William C. Atwater. The Great Fall River fire of 1928 damaged the Fall River Navigation Company building. Fall River Navigation Company was active in supporting the World War II effort. William C. Atwater & Company merged into the Pocahontas Fuel Company in 1958.

William C. Atwater
William C. Atwater was born on July 4, 1861 and graduated from Amherst College in 1884. He Became a selling agent for coal from the Pocahontas Coalfield of West Virginia, which did very well during World War I. William C. Atwater & Company also operated the subsidiary Atwcoal Transportation Company from 1935 to 1950, delivering coal on barges. In 1950 Atwcoal Transportation Company became the American Costal Line.  From 1922 to about 1934 he was active in the Pocahontas Producers Association. William C. Atwater's sons: William C. Atwater and Jr., John J. Atwater became active and took over the firm after his death on February 22, 1940.

World War II
Fall River Navigation Company fleet of ships were used to help the World War II effort. During World War II Fall River Navigation Company operated Merchant navy ships for the United States Shipping Board. During World War II Fall River Navigation Company was active with charter shipping with the Maritime Commission and War Shipping Administration. Fall River Navigation Company operated Liberty ships for the merchant navy. The ship was run by its Fall River Navigation Company crew and the US Navy supplied United States Navy Armed Guards to man the deck guns and radio.

Ships
Ships owned by Fall River Navigation Company:

William C. Atwater, built at River Rouge MI by Great Lakes Engineering Works sold in 1936 and renamed E. J. Kulas  
Atwater was purchased in 1927, built by the Ecorse yard in 1919 as Coulee, in 1943 taken for war effort for as target practice. 
Yankkee Star was the Galen L. Stone, a Liberty Ship purchased in 1947. 
Yankke Dawn, was the Empire Wandle, operated 1948 and 1949, built in 1935
Coastal Highflyer was USS Sebastian (AK-211) purchased in 1947, On 29 July 1947, she ran aground at the east end of Cayo Moa, Grand Shoal, Cuba.

World War II operated by Fall River Navigation Company (post war work):
Liberty Ships:
Galen L. Stone, operated in 1946, purchased in 1947. 
William H. Wilmer, operated 1946 to 1949,
Cecil N. Bean, operated in 1946 to 1949

See also

World War II United States Merchant Navy

References 

Defunct shipping companies of the United States
American companies established in 1927
1927 establishments in Massachusetts
Fall River Navigation Company